Yves Brainville (8 March 1914 – 16 November 1993) was a French film and television actor.

Selected filmography

 Entrée des artistes (1938) - Sylvestre
 Accord final (1938) - Chenal - l'ami de Georges
 Eduardo VII (1939) - Un journaliste
 Le monde en armes (1939)
 Musicians of the Sky (1940) - (uncredited)
 Special Mission (1946) - Le gestionnaire
 La Maison sous la mer (1947) - Un mineur (uncredited)
 Vertiges (1947) - Un assistant
Judicial Error (1948) - Jacques Heurteaux
 The Wolf (1949) - Le docteur Maillet
 Cartouche, King of Paris (1950) - Le comte de Horn
 The Seven Deadly Sins (1952) - Le commandant (segment "Orgueil, L' / Pride") (uncredited)
 The Slave (1953) - Dr. Vienne
 Act of Love (1953) - (uncredited)
 Hungarian Rhapsody (1954) - Dingelstedt
 At the Order of the Czar (1954) - d'Ingelstedt
 The Big Flag (1954) - Un lieutenant
 A Double Life (1954) - Garreau
 Le Couteau sous la gorge (1955) - Inspecteur Aubier
 If All the Guys in the World (1956) - Le docteur Jégou
 Marie Antoinette Queen of France (1956) - Danton
 The Man Who Knew Too Much (1956) - Police Inspector
 Le Long des trottoirs (1956) - Le commissaire Martin 
 Les Aventures de Till L'Espiègle (1956) - Berlemont
 The Mountain (1956) - Andre
 The Crucible (1957) - John Hale
 Le Grand Bluff (1957) - L'ingénieur Watrin
 Paris Holiday (1958) - Inspector Dupont
 A Tale of Two Cities (1958) - Foulon (uncredited)
 Chaque jour a son secret (1958) - Le juge d'instruction
 Rapt au Deuxième Bureau (1958) 
 Bal de nuit (1959) - Le perè de Martine
 Ce soir on tue (1959) - Interpol Man #1
 Monsieur Suzuki (1960)
 Crack in the Mirror (1960) - Prosecutor
 Trapped by Fear (1960) - le commissaire de police
 Le Crime ne paie pas (1962) - Le juge (segment "L'affaire Hugues")
 Five Miles to Midnight (1962) - Monsieur Dompier
 Heaven on One's Head (1965) - Bricourt
 Soleil noir (1966)
 Judoka-Secret Agent (1966) - Paul Vincent, le boss à l'oeil de verre
 The Night of the Generals (1967) - Liesowski
 Asterix the Gaul (1967) - Tonabrix (English version, voice, uncredited)
 Da Berlino l'apocalisse (1967)
 Asterix and Cleopatra (1968) - Vitalstatistix (English version, voice)
 Bye bye, Barbara (1969) - Le commissaire
 Taste of Excitement (1969) - Hotel Proprietor
 Le clan des siciliens (1969) - Le juge
 Mont-Dragon (1970) - (voice)
 Love Me Strangely (1971) - Le commissaire Dedru
 Stavisky (1974) - M. de la Salle
 Q (1974) - Le président de la république
 Impossible... pas français (1974)
 Love and Death (1975) - Andre
 Blondy (1976) - Un diplomate
 International Prostitution: Brigade criminelle (1980)
 The Lady Banker (1980) - Prefaille
 The Bunker (1980) - Gen. Hans Guderian
 Chanel Solitaire (1981) - (uncredited)
 Les Maîtres du temps (1982) - Général (voice)
 Sweet Revenge (1990) - Chase

References

Bibliography
 Hayward, Susan. Simone Signoret: The Star as Cultural Sign. Continuum, 2004.

External links

1914 births
1993 deaths
French male film actors
French male stage actors
Male actors from Paris